is a Japanese retired middle-distance runner who specialized in the 800 metres. She was a two-time national champion in the event.

She has been the coach of the Kanto Gakuin University athletic club since 2019.

Personal best

International competition

National title
Japanese Championships
800 m: 2010, 2011

References

External links

Akari Kishikawa at JAAF 

1985 births
Living people
Japanese female middle-distance runners
Sportspeople from Yokohama
Japan Championships in Athletics winners